Molly Malone Cook (January 5, 1925 – August 25, 2005) was an American photographer. Despite being employed professionally as a photographer for only a short time Cook left behind an extensive collection of printed photographs and negatives, taken throughout her adult life. Cook worked with and photographed dozens of iconic artists and famous faces such as Lorraine Hansberry, Norman Mailer, Eleanor Roosevelt and John Waters.

Career 
Cook's interest in photography began while she was working for the US government in Europe. Upon returning to the United States she was employed as one of the first photographers for The Village Voice. The Village Voice was an alternative weekly publication, which acted as a platform for creatives in New York city, beginning circulation in 1955 and ending in 2018. While creating content for the publication, Cook photographed poet Jean Cocteau, playwright Lorraine Hansberry, Eleanor Roosevelt, Robert Motherwell, writer Norman Mailer and many other famous artists, writers and icons of the time period.

After moving to Provincetown, Massachusetts with her partner in the 1960s, Cook opened the first photographic gallery on the east coast; the VII Photographers studio. The studio represented many successful photographers such as Bernice Abbott, Eugene Atget, Edward Steichen, Harry Callahan, and Minor White. The studio famously sold prints by Ansel Adams for only $35. At the time, photography was considered an art form by only a small community and although patrons were frequent, the studio could not be sustained financially and Cook closed her doors only a few years after opening.

Cook moved on to open the East End Bookshop, where she selectively stocked the shelves based on her personal judgment of quality of the literature. In 1966 Cook hired the soon-to-be famous American filmmaker John Waters, with whom she would maintain a relationship for over 40 years following. When her health began showing signs of decline in 1969, Cook closed the book shop.

In the 1970s Cook worked as a literary agent for her partner Mary Oliver, among other writers, as well as an assistant to Norman Mailer. While working as her agent, anytime they received a call for Oliver, Cook would act as her and many editors would play along.

Personal life 
Cook and Mary Oliver lived together in Provincetown, Massachusetts, after first meeting at the former home of poet Edna St Vincent Millay in the late 1950s. Oliver dedicated many works to Cook and while accepting the national book award in 1992 she publicly thanked Cook saying "Molly Malone Cook, the best reader anyone could have. She is the light of my life". After Cook's death in 2005, Oliver published Our World; a compilation of Cook's journal entries and photography, accompanied by memories, prose and poetry written by Oliver.

Throughout her profession, Cook developed friendships with many iconic American artists such as playwright Lorraine Hansberry, writer Norman Mailer and director John Waters. Waters is said to have brought magazines and newspapers to Cook's home every day towards the end of her illness.

After being put up for adoption as an infant, Cook spent her adulthood interested in discovering her own ancestry. Cook and Oliver visited Virginia several times with the intent of doing so. Among her discoveries, Cook found that she was in fact related to Judith Jefferson, the aunt of Thomas Jefferson. Cook was eventually able to meet her birth parents.

References 

1925 births
2005 deaths
Photographers from California
American LGBT photographers
American lesbian artists